Chi vuol essere milionario? (English translation: Who wants to be a millionaire?), originally titled Chi vuol essere miliardario? (English translation: Who wants to be a thousand millionaire?), is an Italian game show based on the original British format of Who Wants to Be a Millionaire?. The show is hosted by Gerry Scotti and broadcast on the Italian TV station Canale 5.

In the original version (Chi vuol essere miliardario?; 2000–2001), the main goal of the game was to win Lit. 1,000,000,000 by answering 15 multiple-choice questions correctly. There were three "lifelines" – 50:50, Phone-a-Friend and Ask the Audience. If a contestant answered the fifth question correctly, they left with at least Lit. 1,000,000. If a contestant answered the tenth question correctly, they left with at least Lit. 32,000,000. There was one winner of the show, Francesca Cinelli.

In 2002, after the changeover to the Euro, the show changed its name into Chi vuol essere milionario?.

In 2011, the Guinness World Records confirmed Gerry Scotti as the presenter who has hosted the most episodes of the Who Wants to Be a Millionaire? format (1,593, on 5 May 2011).

The game's prizes

Francesca Cinelli's billion lire question
18 March 2001 (gave a right answer)

References

Who Wants to Be a Millionaire?
Italian game shows
2000 Italian television series debuts
2001 Italian television series endings
2000s Italian television series
Canale 5 original programming